Puerto Rico Highway 5 (PR-5) is a main highway in the San Juan Metropolitan area which connects the cities of Cataño to Bayamón and is being extended and converted to a tollway (it has a toll plaza in Bayamón near PR-2 and PR-174) to access the municipalities of Naranjito and Comerío. It is a short freeway from south Cataño to the business area in Bayamón. It makes intersections with PR-22, PR-6, PR-2 and PR-199, where it ends at this time. The highway will parallel PR-167 and will contain the new cable-stayed bridge being built between Bayamón and Naranjito. It will probably end in Puerto Rico highway 152 when completed.

Route description

Cataño to Bayamón
PR-5 begins in a dead end in downtown Cataño, on a peninsula overlooking San Juan Bay. It crosses downtown Cataño on an urban street, passing through the main square. Shortly after an intersection with PR-165, it becomes a divided avenue until reaching PR-22 at the Bayamon city limit.

After the PR-22 intersection, it becomes a freeway, paralleling the Metro Urbano bus rapid transit route. After an intersection with PR-29, it becomes an avenue in downtown Bayamon, where the Metro Urbano ends. After the intersection with PR-2, it becomes a tolled freeway until this section ends, becoming the western section of PR-199.

Toa Alta to Naranjito
This section begins at an intersection with PR-167, near the border with Bayamon. This segment passes through the Jesús Izcoa Moure Bridge and is a freeway until the junction with PR-148. It then continues as a non divide highway, and then becomes divided until its end at an intersection with PR-164 and PR-152. This entire segment was originally known as PR-147.

Tolls

Major intersections

See also

 List of highways numbered 5

References

External links
 

005
Public–private partnerships in Puerto Rico
05